Hamad Medical City is a district in Qatar, located in the municipality of Ad Dawhah. Together with New Al Hitmi and Fereej Bin Omran, it makes up Zone 37 which has a total population of 26,121. It is administered by Hamad Medical Corporation (HMC). It is closely associated with Rumeilah to the east as it also hosts several of HMC's medical facilities.

Geography
Hamad Medical City borders the following districts:
Al Sadd to the south, separated by Al Rayyan Road.
New Al Hitmi to the west, separated by Mohammed Bin Thani Street.
Rumeilah to the east, separated by Ahmed Bin Ali Street.
Fereej Bin Omran and Wadi Al Sail to the north, separated by Mohammed Bin Thani Street.

Infrastructure
Hamad Medical Corporation operates the Women's Hospital and Hamad Hospital out of the district. HMC also has the following facilities set up in the district:
Human Resources Department.
Quality Management Department on Al Rayyan Road.
Security Department on Umm Al Obairiyat Street.
Hamad International Training Centre on Umm Al Obairiyat Street.

The Ministry of Awqaf and Islamic Affairs and the Advisory Council also have offices in the district.

Transport
Currently, the underground Hamad Hospital Metro Station is under construction, having been launched during Phase 1. Once completed, it will be part of Doha Metro's Green Line.

Gallery

References

Communities in Doha